Richfield is a census-designated place (CDP) in Tehama County, California. The 2010 United States census reported Richfield's population was 306.

History
Richfield was founded ca. 1910. A post office was established at Richfield in 1912, and remained in operation until 1964. The community was named for the fertility of their soil.

Geography
According to the United States Census Bureau, the CDP covers an area of 0.56 square miles (1.45 km), all of it land.

Demographics
The 2010 United States Census reported that Richfield had a population of 306. The racial makeup of Richfield was 264 (86.3%) White, 0 (0.0%) African American, 4 (1.3%) Native American, 0 (0.0%) Asian, 0 (0.0%) Pacific Islander, 35 (11.4%) from other races, and 3 (1.0%) from two or more races. Hispanic or Latino of any race were 65 persons (21.2%).

The Census reported that 306 people (100% of the population) lived in households, 0 (0%) lived in non-institutionalized group quarters, and 0 (0%) were institutionalized.

There were 113 households, out of which 43 (38.1%) had children under the age of 18 living in them, 66 (58.4%) were opposite-sex married couples living together, 9 (8.0%) had a female householder with no husband present, 5 (4.4%) had a male householder with no wife present.  There were 5 (4.4%) unmarried opposite-sex partnerships, and 1 (0.9%) same-sex married couples or partnerships. 28 households (24.8%) were made up of individuals, and 13 (11.5%) had someone living alone who was 65 years of age or older. The average household size was 2.71.  There were 80 families (70.8% of all households); the average family size was 3.16.

The population was spread out, with 78 people (25.5%) under the age of 18, 26 people (8.5%) aged 18 to 24, 77 people (25.2%) aged 25 to 44, 80 people (26.1%) aged 45 to 64, and 45 people (14.7%) who were 65 years of age or older.  The median age was 40.0 years. For every 100 females, there were 117.0 males.  For every 100 females age 18 and over, there were 117.1 males.

The homeowner vacancy rate was 0%; the rental vacancy rate was 8.6%.  219 people (71.6% of the population) lived in owner-occupied housing units and 87 people (28.4%) lived in rental housing units.

Businesses
This tiny town is bounded by four businesses.  Eco-Shell, Inc., which was established in 1990 as an industrial walnut grinding facility south of Richfield.  Sierra Pacific Industries operates Richfield Millwork to the north.  Richfield Feed and Supply operates on Highway 99 to the west, and Richfield School House Market is within the town to the east.

References

Census-designated places in Tehama County, California
Census-designated places in California